Elections to Magherafelt District Council were held on 5 May 2005 on the same day as the other Northern Irish local government elections. The election used three district electoral areas to elect a total of 16 councillors.

Election results

Note: "Votes" are the first preference votes.

Districts summary

|- class="unsortable" align="centre"
!rowspan=2 align="left"|Ward
! % 
!Cllrs
! % 
!Cllrs
! %
!Cllrs
! %
!Cllrs
! % 
!Cllrs
!rowspan=2|TotalCllrs
|- class="unsortable" align="center"
!colspan=2 bgcolor="" | Sinn Féin
!colspan=2 bgcolor="" | DUP
!colspan=2 bgcolor="" | SDLP
!colspan=2 bgcolor="" | UUP
!colspan=2 bgcolor="white"| Others
|-
|align="left"|Magherafelt Town
|35.0
|2
|bgcolor="#D46A4C"|35.2
|bgcolor="#D46A4C"|2
|20.3
|1
|9.6
|1
|0.0
|0
|6
|-
|align="left"|Moyola
|bgcolor="#008800"|48.6
|bgcolor="#008800"|3
|23.8
|1
|11.6
|0
|9.4
|1
|6.6
|0
|5
|-
|align="left"|Sperrin
|bgcolor="#008800"|56.6
|bgcolor="#008800"|3
|10.8
|1
|22.9
|1
|0.0
|0
|9.7
|0
|5
|- class="unsortable" class="sortbottom" style="background:#C9C9C9"
|align="left"| Total
|46.7
|8
|23.2
|4
|18.5
|2
|6.2
|2
|5.4
|0
|16
|-
|}

District results

Magherafelt Town

2001: 2 x DUP, 2 x Sinn Féin, 1 x SDLP, 1 x UUP
2005: 3 x DUP, 1 x Sinn Féin, 1 x SDLP, 1 x UUP
2001-2005 Change: No change

Moyola

2001: 2 x Sinn Féin, 1 x DUP, 1 x UUP, 1 x SDLP
2005: 3 x Sinn Féin, 1 x DUP, 1 x UUP
2001-2005 Change: Sinn Féin gain from SDLP

Sperrin

2001: 3 x Sinn Féin, 1 x SDLP, 1 x Independent
2005: 3 x Sinn Féin, 1 x SDLP, 1 x DUP
2001-2005 Change: DUP gain from Independent

References

Magherafelt District Council elections
Magherafelt